Melanie Purkiss (born, 11 March 1979) is a British track and field athlete. She reached the semi-finals of the 400 metres at the 2002 Commonwealth Games in Manchester.

She was educated at The Mountbatten School in Romsey, Hampshire, England.

References

Details of Melanie Purkiss's career to date.
Melanie Purkiss's page at Power of 10

Living people
1979 births
People from Romsey
English female sprinters
British female sprinters
Athletes (track and field) at the 2002 Commonwealth Games
Commonwealth Games medallists in athletics
Commonwealth Games silver medallists for England
Medallists at the 2002 Commonwealth Games